The A512 is an A road entirely in Leicestershire, UK. It links the primary destination of Loughborough with the M1, A42 road, and the town of Ashby de la Zouch.

The road begins just outside Loughborough Town Centre, near to The Rushes  It heads out of town, crossing the A6004 Epinal Way and passing Loughborough University. On leaving the town, there is a short dual carriageway section, leading to the junction with Snells Nook Lane to Nanpantan and Woodhouse.

At this junction, much of the traffic from Loughborough turns off, and it is a much quieter A512 that enters Shepshed. After Shepshed, the road passes through Northern Charnwood Forest, near the villages of Peggs Green, Thringstone, Griffydam, Belton and Osgathorpe. Shortly before Ashby it passes Coleorton Hall on the right – a house which has played host to Scott, Wordsworth, Coleridge and others – now converted to apartments.

The road ends at the junction with the A42 and A511 (formerly the A50), on the edge of Ashby 

References 

Roads in England
Transport in Leicestershire